Guwahati College is a general degree college in Guwahati city of Assam, India. This college is affiliated with Gauhati University.

History 
The college was established in 1964, There were no classroom buildings at first and the classes were initially held in borrowed premises of the Mohurris' Training Institute with only 75 students on site at Bamunimaidan in Guwahati city.

Departments

Arts
 Assamese
 English
Education
Economics
Geography
History
Political Science

Science
Botany
Chemistry
Economics
Geography
Mathematics
Physics
Zoology

Accreditation
In 2015 the college has been awarded B grade by the National Assessment and Accreditation Council.

References

Universities and colleges in Guwahati
Colleges affiliated to Gauhati University
Educational institutions established in 1964
1964 establishments in Assam
Colleges in Assam